The Taça de Cabo Verde (Portuguese for the Cape Verdean Cup, also as the Capeverdean Cup) is the main knock-out football tournament of the Cape Verde islands. It started in 1982, it was later revived in 2007 and is played annually. The competition features the winners of each island or regional cup competition and competes into two groups.

History
The first edition took place in 1982 and was only broadcast on radio, television broadcasts did not began until 1997, its first telecast of the cup competition began in 2007.  Most of the matches, all of the semis and finals were broadcast on TCV and RCV.  Some of the matches were broadcast on regional television and radio including Rádio Barlavento and Rádio Praia (or AM Praia).

From the 2013 edition, the winner competes in the Cape Verdean Cup, the only time done was Onze Unidos, the 2012 cup winner.

There had been no cup competitions since 2013 and is uncertain about the cancellation of recent tournaments. With the National Championships held in 2017 which originally to finish in July and extended into late-August, the 2017 national cup competition was again not held.  It is one of the countries in Africa which a football cup competition was held for just five seasons.

The next cup competition is now taking place, for the 2018 season.

Winners

Seasons in the Cape Verdean Cup
The number of seasons that each team (in alphabetical order) has played in the Second Division from 1982 to 2012.

See also
Cape Verdean Football Championships
Cape Verdean Super Cup

Notes

References

External links
 Cape Verde Islands - List of Cup Winners, RSSSF.com

Football cup competitions in Cape Verde
Cape Verde
Recurring sporting events established in 1982
1982 establishments in Cape Verde